or  is a lake that lies in the municipality of Saltdal in Nordland county, Norway. The lake flows out through the river Bjøllåga and ultimately into the river Ranelva.

See also
 List of lakes in Norway
 Geography of Norway

References

Saltdal
Lakes of Nordland